Wamberal is a coastal suburb of the Central Coast region of New South Wales, Australia, just north of Terrigal. It is part of the  local government area and is located adjacent to the Wamberal Lagoon. Wamberal is an Aboriginal word meaning 'where the sea breaks'.

Geography and amenities  
Wamberal is the next suburb from Terrigal, with the two suburbs being separated by the Terrigal Lagoon Estuary.

The suburb has two distinct areas; there is a coastal strip that includes Wamberal Beach and the Lagoon estuary which houses medium to high-density residential properties, as well as a semi-rural area, slightly west of the beach. The latter contains coastal acreages and ridges of bushland which are legislated non-development areas to retain the area's ecosystem.

The main thoroughfare through the suburb is the Central Coast Highway through the north and south, previously known as The Entrance Road.  Since 2008, the roadway has undergone developments at an estimated cost of A$100  million into a four-lane dual carriageway from Matcham to the north end of the suburb. Servicing the suburb from the south-east is Ocean View Drive, linking Wamberal to Terrigal.
 
Wamberal has small clusters of high-end cafes, restaurants and boutique stores dotted along the beachfront strip, Ocean View Drive, and on nearby streets. In 2009 the Wamberal Surf Life Saving Club was redeveloped to accommodate a cafe and award-winning restaurant, in addition to new function rooms and surf life-saving amenities. Wamberal also has a Country Club, "Breakers", commemorating ANZAC efforts; its amenities include a golf course, bowling green and tennis facilities in addition to a brasserie and various bars with gambling outlets, all overlooking the lagoon front.

Wamberal beach has 3.8 km of uninterrupted sand and can be enjoyed by humans and dogs alike. People with a disability may access Wamberal Beach with a Sand Cruiser wheelchair available for bookings. Contact Wamberal Surf Club

Swimming
Wamberal is dominated by active and often strong rips, particularly north of the surf club. Definitely swim between the flags. The lagoon also offers a quieter swimming area. Usually there is an attached bar with only small rips, however higher waves will increase rip strength, so it is still best to stay between the flags.

Surfing
Wamberal picks up more swell and generally has good beach breaks as well as waves over the northern reefs.

Writing celebrating this beach is featured in "Guide to Sydney Beaches" (Meuse Press).

There is a government primary school in the rural sector of the suburb, teaching kindergarten through grade six.

Storms in 2020 highlighted problems of erosion that remain unresolved.

Demographics 

Aboriginal and Torres Strait Islander people made up 1.3% of the population. The median age in Wamberal was 38 years, just above the national median of 37. Children aged 0–14 years made up 21.4% of the population, while people aged 65 years and over made up 13.9% of the population, just below the national median of 14%. Of people in the suburb aged 15 years and over, 54.3% were married and 11.1% were either divorced or separated.

Population growth in Wamberal between the 2001 and 2006 censuses was 5.08% (national average 5.78%) and in the five years to the 2011 census, it was 10.24% (national average 8.32%). The median weekly income for Wamberal residents was about 25% higher than the national average.

At the 2011 census, the proportion of residents in Wamberal who stated their ancestry as Australian or Anglo-Saxon exceeded 83%. More than 60% of Wamberal residents nominated a religious affiliation with Christianity, which was significantly higher than the national average of 50.2%. Compared to the national average, households in Wamberal had a lower proportion (6.3%) where two or more languages are spoken (national average 20.4%), and a higher proportion (92.6%) where only English was spoken at home (national average 76.8%).

Property 
The prestige of Wamberal's property has increased dramatically in recent years largely due to leafy and family-friendly streets, shrinking availability of land, and the suburb's proximity to local amenities including public transport, commercial and industrial areas, and education while remaining distant. This motif was heralded in 2008 by the passing in at auction of a 1940s bungalow on a double block of beachfront land at A$7.2  million. The property has since been redeveloped, believed to be worth more than $10  million, which would make it the most valuable home on the Central Coast.

This practice of redevelopment of property within Wamberal is shifting property prices further upmarket and moving the suburb further into the limelight with wealthier home buyers.  This shift may also be due to the redevelopment of local amenities such as playgrounds and community spaces such as parks, some of which were initiated under the Nation Building Scheme of the Rudd Government's Economic Stimulus Policy.  In September 2010, the median house price for Wamberal was $1.1  million.

References 

Guide to Sydney Beaches
"Sand in our Souls - the Beach in Australian History" Leone Huntsman, MUP, 2001

Suburbs of the Central Coast (New South Wales)